Khosrow Khani may refer to:

Khosrow Khani, Delfan, Iran
Khosrow Khani, Khorramabad, Iran

See also
Khosrow Khan (disambiguation)